Matilde Diez (Madrid, 1818 – January 16, 1883) was a Spanish theater actress.

Biography 
She began acting when she was only twelve years old with the play La huérfana de Bruxelles, performed at the Teatro de Cádiz. In 1834 the theater impresario Juan Grimaldi hired her to work in Madrid, reaping her first success with the play Clotilde, by Federico Soulié.

In 1836, she married the actor Julián Romea. Together they performed numerous plays at the Teatro Español, such as Gabriela de Belle-Isle or the first performance of a play by William Shakespeare directly translated from English: Macbeth, in 1838 at the Teatro del Príncipe.

Already consecrated as one of the most outstanding Spanish actresses of the moment, she shone in dozens of performances, such as Catalina Howard, The lovers of Teruel, The duende lady, The game is on between fools, Mother's love, Storms of the heart, The braid of her hair, and The Governess.

Between 1853 and 1858 she moved to America, achieving new triumphs in Mexico City and Havana. In her last years she taught at the Madrid Conservatory of Music and Declamation. Notable among her public recognitions is her appointment as first camera actress by Queen Elizabeth II.

She died at the beginning of 1883 and was buried in the cemetery of San Nicolás. Her remains are found in a pantheon in the cemetery of San Lorenzo and San José in Madrid.

References

1818 births
1883 deaths
Actresses from Madrid